Bronte Campbell  (born 14 May 1994) is a Malawian-born Australian competitive swimmer, a dual Olympic gold-medal winner and world champion. Her older sister, Cate, is also a competitive swimmer, and once held world records in both the short and long course 100 metre individual freestyle events. Bronte and Cate are the first Australian siblings on the same Olympic swimming team since the 1972 Olympics and the first Australian sisters ever to compete within the same swimming event at the Olympics. Bronte Campbell won three gold medals at the 2015 World Championships, including the 50 and 100 metre freestyle events.

Early life 
Campbell is the second of five children born to Eric (an accountant) and Jenny (a nurse) Campbell. She has an older sister, Cate, two younger sisters and a younger brother, Jessica, Abigail and Hamish. Hamish has severe cerebral palsy and requires around-the-clock care. She shares a birthday with Hamish, with Hamish being four years younger. Jenny used to be a synchronised swimmer and taught her four daughters to swim.

Career
Campbell's family moved from Malawi to Australia in 2001 and she and Cate joined the Indooroopilly Swimming Club in Brisbane that same year. Their coach at Commercial, Simon Cusack, continues to coach both sisters.

In 2009, Campbell won gold in the 50 metre freestyle at the Australian Youth Olympic Festival. In 2011, she won gold in the same event at the 2011 FINA World Junior Swimming Championships in Lima, Peru.

2012
Campbell competed in the women's 50 meter freestyle at the 2012 Summer Olympics in London. She and her sister Cate swam in the same heat, finishing second and third and qualifying for the semi-final in ninth and tenth place, respectively.

2013
At the 2013 Australian Swimming Championships she won silver in the 50 and 100 metre freestyle events finishing behind sister Cate in both and qualified for the 2013 World Aquatics Championships. At the World Championships, she teamed up with Cate, Emma McKeon and Alicia Coutts in the 4 × 100 metre freestyle relay where they won the silver medal, finishing 0.12 of a second behind the United States.

2014
Competing at the 2014 FINA World Swimming Championships (25 m) in Doha, she won two silver medals, one in the 50 metre freestyle event (timing 23.62) behind Ranomi Kromowidjojo, and the other in the 4 × 100 metre medley relay behind the Danish team.
She finished fourth (timing 51.65) in the finals of the 100-metre freestyle event, behind Femke Heemskerk, Ranomi Kromowidjojo and Sarah Sjöström.

2015

At the 2015 World Championships in Kazan, she won three gold medals and one bronze. She finished first in the 100 metre freestyle event (in 52.52), beating Sarah Sjöström and Cate Campbell, and the 50 metre freestyle event (in 24.12), beating Ranomi Kromowidjojo and Sarah Sjöström.

She also won gold in the 4×100 metre freestyle relay, beating the Dutch and US teams by a comfortable lead, and a bronze medal in the 4 × 100 metre medley relay behind the Chinese and Swedish teams.

2016
At the 2016 Summer Olympics, Campbell represented Australia in both the 50 m and 100 m freestyle, as well as the 4 × 100 m freestyle relay (in which they came first and set a new world record). Despite being the reigning world champion in the 50 and 100 m freestyle, she did not win a medal in these events.

2018 
At the Gold Coast Commonwealth Games, Campbell won gold in the 4x100m freestyle, silver in the 50m freestyle, gold in the 100m freestyle, and gold in the 4x100m medley relay.

2021 
Campbell starred in Head Above Water, a documentary series focusing on 4 Australian swimmers: Ian Thorpe, Kyle Chalmers, Cody Simpson, and Campbell herself. Campbell qualified for her third Olympics in Tokyo. She won gold in the women's 4x100m freestyle relay and bronze in the 4x100m mixed medley relay.

2022

In May 2022, Campbell appeared as a contestant on the sixth season of The Celebrity Apprentice Australia.

Personal life
Campbell is a student at Queensland University of Technology, where she is studying Business, majoring in Public Relations.

Until December 2016, Campbell lived with her sister, Cate. As of 2017, they are no longer housemates, and she currently resides in Coorparoo.

She is also a poet, writing poems and reading them out to the swim team before a competition to give them motivation.

Results in major championships

World records

Long course metres

 split 53.15 (1st leg); with Melanie Schlanger (2nd leg), Emma McKeon (3rd leg), Cate Campbell (4th leg)
 split 52.15 (3rd leg); with Emma McKeon (1st leg), Brittany Elmslie (2nd leg), Cate Campbell (4th leg)
 split 52.99 (2nd leg); with Shayna Jack (1st leg), Emma McKeon (3rd leg), Cate Campbell (4th leg)
 split 53.01 (1st leg); with Meg Harris (2nd leg), Emma McKeon (3rd leg), Cate Campbell (4th leg)

Short course metres

 split 24.03 (3rd leg); with Tomaso D'Orsogna (1st leg), Regan Leong (2nd leg), Cate Campbell (4th leg)
 split 23.44 (4th leg); with Tomaso D'Orsogna (1st leg), Travis Mahoney (2nd leg), Cate Campbell (3rd leg)

Olympic records

Long course metres

 split 53.26 (3rd leg); with Madison Wilson (1st leg ), Brittany Elmslie (2nd leg), Cate Campbell (4th leg)
 split 52.15 (3rd leg); with Emma McKeon (1st leg), Brittany Elmslie (2nd leg), Cate Campbell (4th leg)
 split 53.01 (1st leg); with Meg Harris (2nd leg), Emma McKeon (3rd leg), Cate Campbell (4th leg)

See also
List of Olympic medalists in swimming (women)
List of World Aquatics Championships medalists in swimming (women)
List of Commonwealth Games medallists in swimming (women)
World record progression 4 × 100 metres freestyle relay

References

External links

  (archive 2)
 
 
 
 
 
 

1994 births
Malawian emigrants to Australia
Malawian people of British descent
Commonwealth Games bronze medallists for Australia
Commonwealth Games gold medallists for Australia
Commonwealth Games silver medallists for Australia
Australian female freestyle swimmers
Australian public relations people
Living people
Olympic swimmers of Australia
People from Blantyre
Sportswomen from Queensland
Swimmers at the 2012 Summer Olympics
Swimmers at the 2014 Commonwealth Games
World Aquatics Championships medalists in swimming
Swimmers from Brisbane
World record holders in swimming
Swimmers at the 2016 Summer Olympics
Medalists at the 2016 Summer Olympics
Olympic gold medalists for Australia
Olympic gold medalists in swimming
Swimmers at the 2018 Commonwealth Games
Commonwealth Games medallists in swimming
Recipients of the Medal of the Order of Australia
Swimmers at the 2020 Summer Olympics
Medalists at the 2020 Summer Olympics
The Apprentice Australia candidates
Medallists at the 2014 Commonwealth Games
Medallists at the 2018 Commonwealth Games